Swan Islands Nature Reserve is a strict nature reserve, protecting a series of islands off the northwest coast of the Crimean Peninsula that this an important resting place for migratory birds in the summer and fall, and a nesting place in winter. It is a sub-unit of the Crimean Nature Reserve. Administratively, it is in Rozdolne Raion of Crimea.

Topography
The islands stretch for 8 km, with elevations reaching only 2 meters above the level of the Black Sea.  The land area of the islands themselves is only 52 ha, but the protected shallow marine areas around the islands stretch for about 30 km along the northwest coast and have an area of 9,560 hectares.   A further 27,646 hectares of surrounding area have been declared a wildlife sanctuary.

Climate and ecoregion

Flora and fauna
Overall, 255 species of birds have been recorded in the reserve territory.  In winter, bird counts have estimated 10 to 30 thousand ducks (including mallard, teal, merganser and others), up to 2 thousand geese (greater white-fronted goose and grey goose), up to 2 thousand coots, more than a thousand gulls, and more than 2.5 thousand swans (mute swan, whooper swan).

Public use
As a strict nature reserve, Swan Island's primary purpose is protection of nature and scientific study.  Public access is restricted: mass recreation and construction of facilities is prohibited as are hunting and fishing.

See also
 Lists of Nature Preserves of Ukraine (class Ia protected areas)
 National Parks of Ukraine (class II protected areas)
 Crimean Nature Reserve

References

External links
 Boundaries of Swan Island Nature Reserve on OpenStreetMap.org

Nature reserves in Ukraine
Nature reserves in Russia
Geography of Crimea